Jacksons Lake is a small lake in the Moira River and Lake Ontario drainage basins in Addington Highlands, Lennox and Addington County, Ontario, Canada.

The primary inflow at the northwest and outflow at the southeast is an unnamed creek that is a right tributary of Little Skootamatta Creek. That creek flows via the Skootamatta River and Moira River into the Bay of Quinte on Lake Ontario at Belleville.

See also
List of lakes in Ontario

References

Lakes of Lennox and Addington County